Honey baby, Honey baby is a 1974 American action film directed by Michael Schultz. The film focuses on the adventures of Laura Lewis, a young woman from Harlem known as "Honey Baby" (Diana Sands), who wins a game show trip to Beirut, Lebanon. While on this trip, she and her cousin Skiggy (J.Eric Bell) get in trouble after she encounters a Chinese woman named Madame Chan (Gay Suilin), who, unknown to Laura and Skiggy, implants a dot with the secret formula of a deceased prince's body in Honey Baby's purse. Consequently, mercenaries track Honey Baby to get the formula back.

The film was also released in the United States under a variety of alternate titles such as, "Honeybaby, Honeybaby", "Honeybaby", and "Three Days in Beirut".

Plot 
The film follows "Honey Baby" on her trip to Beirut where she is hunted down by a variety of people seeking a micro dot from her, which was planted on her by Madame Chan and contains a sought-after secret formula. Honey Baby's role as a target becomes evident once she is approached by an African man who is inquiring about the disappearance of Madame Chan, and murdered shortly after. Honey Baby then meets a man named "Liv" (Calvin Lockhart) who she proceeds to go on a date with. Liv's ulterior motive is revealed at the conclusion of their date as he confesses to his interest in the disappearance of Madame Chan, despite enjoying Honey Baby's company.

Amidst driving home from their date, Liv's car is chased by multiple men in an attempt to assassinate Honey Baby. Upon reaching a dead-end, Honey Baby is involved in a shootout as Liv gives her a gun with instructions to 'run like hell'. Following the shootout, Madame Chan's missing body is put into Honey Baby's closet by "Makuba" (Head of the Operations).

The next day, Honey Baby begins to face different pressures from the producer of the game show, Sam (Seth Allen), who wants to constantly shoot her "having fun" to show the viewers back home. He even suggests that "if we get you in a pants suit, on a horse, and put you in an Afro hairdo we got something" as a solution to re-brand her. Honey Baby rejects this because she just wants to be herself and doesn't want to change. However, she does eventually agree to go on a live game show to continue her trip to Lebanon. She is to be filmed sitting on a ski lift over Lebanon. Before the show can begin, an assassin cuts the rope steadying her, causing her to speed down the line and almost die on National Television.

In the end, Laura reveals that the guy that everyone believes to be Makuba is actually General Christian Awani (Thomas Baptiste) and he kidnapped the real Makuba to steal his identity and obtain the secret formula of the dead prince's body. As revenge for constantly trying to kill her, Honey Baby locks Awani in the Prince's castle in order for him to be arrested when the police arrive.

Cast
 Diana Sands as Laura Lewis / "Honey Baby"
 Calvin Lockhart as "Liv" 
 Seth Allen as Sam 
 Bricktop as Harry's Mother 
 J. Eric Bell as "Skiggy" Lewis 
 Thomas Baptiste as General Christian Awani

Soundtrack

Credits 
 Art Direction – Dick Smith (9)
 Artwork – Katrina Taylor (2)
 Bass – Francisco Centeno
 Clavinet – Weldon J. Irvine*
 Drums – Brian O. Grice*
 Electric Piano – Nathaniel Adderley Jr.*
 Flute – Harald Milton Jones*, Philip L. Bodner*, William Slapin
 French Horn – Brooks Tillotson, James Buffington*, Peter Gordon (8)
 Guitar – Bradley Bobo
 Harp – Margaret Ross
 Percussion – David Carey, Richard V. Powell*
 Performer [Tender Loving Care] – Deirdre Tuck, Jocye Tuck, Renelle Stafford
 Piano [Pianoforte] – Carl Maults-By*
 Producer, Arranged By, Adapted By, Conductor – Carl Maults-By*
 Recorded By, Mixed By – Dick Baxter
 Saxophone – Frank Wess, Seldon Powell
 Strings – Alan Shulman, Alfred Brand, Charles Libove, Emanuel Green, Emanuel Vardi, George Ricci, Harry Cykman, Harry Lookofsky, Harry Zaratzian, Joe Malin, Joseph Malignacci*, Julien C. Barber*, Kermit Moore, Lewis Eley, Max Ellen, Max Pollikoff, Paul Gershman, Selwart Richard Clarke*,Theodore Israel
 Strings, Concertmaster – Gene Orloff
 Trombone – Garnett Brown, Paul Faulise, Wayne J. Andre*
 Trumpet, Flugelhorn – Ernest Royal*, Blood Hollins*, Raymond Crisara*
 Vocals – Friends Of Distinction*, Tender Loving Care, Zulema

See also
 List of American films of 1974

External links
 
 

1974 films
Films directed by Michael Schultz
1974 action films
Films set in Lebanon
American action films
1970s English-language films
1970s American films